The Holden HQ series is a range of automobiles that was produced by Holden in Australia from 1971 to 1974. The HQ was released on 15 July 1971, replacing the Holden HG series. It was the first ground-up redesign of the Holden line since its original release in 1948, and included an all-new body, chassis, and suspension. The HQ was later developed into a series of successor models, finally ending production when the WB series was discontinued in 1984.

Model range 
The mainstream HQ passenger car range consisted of four-door sedan and five-door station wagon models in three trim levels.
 Holden Belmont sedan
 Holden Kingswood sedan
 Holden Premier sedan
 Holden Belmont station wagon
 Holden Kingswood station wagon
 Holden Premier station wagon

The long wheelbase luxury model, "Statesman by GMH" consisted of one body style (four-door sedan) and was available in two trim levels.
 Statesman
 Statesman Deville

A Holden SS sedan was released in August 1972. Although marketed as a separate model in reality it was a Belmont V8 sedan fitted with the XV2 option package.

The Monaro range initially consisted only of two-door coupes.
 Holden Monaro
 Holden Monaro GTS
 Holden Monaro GTS 350
 Holden Monaro LS

Two four-door sedan variants of the Monaro GTS were released in March 1973 and similarly to the SS the new sports sedans were a special vehicle package optioned on a lesser model, in this case on a V8 Kingswood sedan. Option XV4 was the HQ GTS sedan. Option XW8 was the HQ GTS350 sedan.

The commercial vehicle range included coupe utility, panel van and cab chassis truck models.
 Holden Belmont utility
 Holden Kingswood utility
 Holden Belmont panel van
 Holden One Tonner

The One Tonner, which was new for the HQ series, was a cab chassis truck. A Sandman option, which was offered on utility and panel van models from January 1974, included various "sports" items from the Monaro GTS.

Engines 

Production 
Production of the HQ range totalled 485,650 vehicles prior to its replacement by the Holden HJ series in October 1974.
Holden HQ series cars were produced at GMH plants in Adelaide (Elizabeth, South Australia), Melbourne (Dandenong, Victoria), Sydney (Pagewood, New South Wales) and in Brisbane (Acacia Ridge, Queensland).

Engines, transmissions, and final drive assemblies were produced at the engine casting plant at Fishermans Bend, Victoria, although  engines and its drivetrain components were fully imported from fellow General Motors subsidiary, Chevrolet, in the United States.

Many local automotive component businesses in all these states across Australia supplied the main plants with many other parts, such as wiper arms, glass, carpets, electrical systems, fasteners, and the like.

HQ production in New Zealand was at GMNZ's assembly plant at Trentham, Wellington, New Zealand using some NZ production components and ran until 1975 to use up HQ parts that weren't used on the following Holden HJ series.

Specifications

Belmont 

The Belmont was the barebones HQ, successor to the Holden Standard, coming with a standard 173 cubic inch Inline 6 and column shift 3 speed manual, The Belmont also featured a unique, more toned down door trim design.

Kingswood 

The Kingswood was a slightly midrange, just like the Special it replaced, with a more stylish interior, featuring armrests as standard, and added exterior chrome.

Premier 

The Premier was the top dog of the mainstream 'Holden' Line throughout to the release of the XV8 GTS350 Sedan in 1973, featuring a woodgrain styled interior, full length armrests, a standard center console with bucket seats, and many exterior style accents. The Premier's design language was also carried through to the Monaro LS coúpe.

SS 

The SS was a limited edition variant of the Belmont V8 Sedan, Option code XV8, Featured a 253 cubic inch Holden V8 as standard, with an optional 308 cubic inch V8 variant optional, mated to an Aussie 4 Speed Gearbox, and 3.36:1 Ratio 10-Bolt Salisbury differential as standard, making the SS a hit among younger power hungry drivers, so much so that a Series II SS was released after the Series I run failed to meet demand, in the end, Holden had produced 2800, The SS also featured a Black Roebuck Vinyl Interior with Houndstooth or Flax-Raydo inserts, Standard arm rests, center console with floor shift, Sport Steering wheel and a full GTS dash cluster.

GTS 

The GTS was a specification of the HQ Holden Monaro, Based on the Kingswood, decked out with all the bells and whistles, the GTS featured its own stripe style, available in most colours, along with a choice of 253 or 308 Holden V8s, mated to either a 4 Speed Holden manual  or 3 speed GM Turbo-Hydramatic 350 automatic, backed by a heavy-duty Salisbury differential, the GTS package featured a full interior with optional houndstooth seat inserts in standard bucket seats, sports steering wheel, center console, tachometer, dual split gauges (pictured) and more.

South Africa 
For the South African market, the Holden HQ sedan was marketed as the Chevrolet Kommando, and the HQ utility as the Chevrolet El Camino. The Kommando received only the Chevrolet 4.1-litre six while the Constantia was also offered with the Holden 5.0-litre V8 coupled to an automatic transmission. The El Camino received both of these options as well as a new (to South Africa) 3.3-litre six, only in conjunction with a manual transmission. The HQ One Tonner was sold as the Chevrolet El Toro.

Motorsport 
With the introduction of the HQ model, Holden's factory supported production-car racing efforts shifted from the V8 Monaro to the smaller six-cylinder LC Torana. A few Monaro and V8 engined Kingswood cars were built for racing, most notably Malcolm Ramsey's V8 Kingswood. These HQs were never as successful as earlier model Monaros had been or the larger-budget Torana teams or the Ford Falcons and Mustangs they raced against.

From the late 1980s, the Holden HQ was used in Australia as the basis of a one-make motor racing category with an emphasis on cost. The category began in Tasmania but very quickly expanded to every state and New Zealand to become the entry-level motor racing category nationwide. The cars are built to comply with CAMS Group 3H Technical Regulations. The series is utilises the 202 ci/3300 cc size six-cylinder engine, the largest six-cylinder engine sold in the car, and is limited to four-door sedan bodied cars.

The HQ motor racing category also had an effect on spare parts in wrecking yards around Australia, with parts and body panels becoming scarce as many of the teams would 'raid' the yards for cheap spares. This led to a shortage of spares for the HQ model for anyone who owned a road-going version.

Statesman HQ 

The Statesman HQ range of long wheelbase luxury sedans, based on the Holden HQ series, was also released in July 1971. The Statesman models replaced the Holden Brougham from the HG range however they were marketed as Statesmans rather than as Holdens. The Statesman HQ was offered in two models, the base "Statesman Custom" and the premium "Statesman de Ville".

References 

Cars of Australia
Holden vehicles by series
Cars introduced in 1971
1970s cars